Saint-Benoît-du-Sault is a commune in the Indre department in central France.

It is a medieval village, perched in a curve on a rocky butte overlooking the Portefeuille River in the former province of Berry.
In 1988, it was named one of "the most beautiful villages of France."

History
Located in the area of Gaul settled by a powerful Celtic tribe, the Bituriges,  "Kings of the World" (summa penes imperii bituriges), powerful until their defeat against Julius Caesar at Bourges (Avaricum), part of Roman Aquitania.

Two dolmens (Passebonneau and des Gorces) near to Saint-Benoît-du-Sault attest to the ancientness of human presence, if not of the Bituriges. Ten centuries later, in 974, some benedictine monks of Sacierges-Saint-Martin took refuge on a granite spur, where they founded a priory: Salis, future Saint-Benoît-du-Sault. From the 10th to the 17th century, the history of the priory and the new village is made up of resistance to the possessive desires of feudal neighbours, such as the Limoges and de Brosse family.
The town was surrounded by a double line of ramparts. The first, the most ancient, protected the priory, the church and the fort, the second established in the 15th century, encircled the commercial part.
Its maze of narrow cobbled streets remains popular with sightseers.

Population

Sights
Of architectural significance:

 Belfry.
 14th-century portal.
 14th-century Roman Priory. (Monuments Historiques)
 The medieval city in general.
 Castle of Brosse

Personalities
People associated with Saint-Benoît-du-Sault:

 Hervé Faye (1814–1902), astronomer
 François-Timoléon de Choisy (1644–1724), priest and author
 Herbert Southworth (1908–1999), historian

See also
Communes of the Indre department

Citations

General bibliography 
 Les origines de la vicomté de Brosse et de la prévôté de Saint Benoît du Sault, by Roland Aubert. Imprimerie Sodimass S.A Le Pont-Chrétien-Chabenet (Indre) 2005, 
 Recherches archéologiques dans la région de Saint-Benoît du-Sault, by E. de Beaufort.
 Sur les Miracles de Saint-Benoît du Sault, by Adrevald, Adelaire, Aimoin and André (Monks of the Fleury abbay) 878-1050.

External links

 Saint-Benoît-du-Sault in pictures
 Saint-Benoît-du-Sault seen by Willy Ronis

Communes of Indre
County of La Marche
Plus Beaux Villages de France
Indre communes articles needing translation from French Wikipedia